Schorr is a surname. Notable people with the surname include:
 Avraham Schorr, American rabbi
 Bill Schorr, American cartoonist
 Daniel Schorr (1916–2010), American journalist
 Friedrich Schorr (1888–1953), Hungarian-Austrian opera singer, chazzan
 Gedalia Schorr (1910–1979), American rabbi and philosopher
 Israel Schorr (1886–1935) Poland-born chazzan
 Michael Schorr, American rock drummer
 Mike Schorr, fictional character in Wonder Woman comics
 Moses Schorr (1874–1941), rabbi, Polish historian, Bible scholar, orientalist
 Renen Schorr (born 1952), Israeli film director, screenwriter, film producer
 Richard Schorr (1867–1951), German astronomer
 Sari Schorr, American blues rock singer and songwriter
 Todd Schorr (born 1954), American pop surrealist painter

See also 
 Kehat Shorr (1919–1972), Israeli shooting coach, Munich massacre victim
 Schorr (crater), a crater on the far side of the moon, named after Richard Schorr
 Schor (disambiguation)
 Score (disambiguation)
 Shore (disambiguation)

Hebrew-language surnames
Jewish surnames
Germanic-language surnames